The Center for Adoption Policy (CAP) is a New York based 501(c)(3) organization. Its mission is to provide research, analysis, advice and education to practitioners and the public about current legislation and practices governing domestic and inter-country adoption in the United States, Europe, Asia, Latin America and Africa. CAP is an independent entity. It is not affiliated with any agency or entity involved in the placement of children.

External links
Center for Adoption Policy

Adoption-related organizations
Children's charities based in the United States
Charities based in New York City